The 2008 Sun Belt Conference football season was an NCAA football season that was played from August 28, 2008, to December 26, 2008. The Sun Belt Conference consisted of 8 football members:  Arkansas State, Florida Atlantic, Florida International, Louisiana-Lafayette, Louisiana-Monroe, Middle Tennessee, North Texas, and Troy. Troy won the Sun Belt Championship but lost the Southern Miss in the New Orleans Bowl. FAU defeated Central Michigan in the Motor City Bowl 24–21.

References